Lodhi Road (Hindi: लोधी रोड, Urdu: لودھی مارگ) in New Delhi, India, is named after the Lodhi Gardens located on it.  Two Mughal mausoleums, Humayun's Tomb and Safdarjung's Tomb, lie at the eastern and western ends of the road respectively. A number of cultural, educational, and international institutions line the road. The Jor Bagh metro station lies under Aurobindo Marg near its intersection with Lodhi Road. Also located near it are Lodhi colony and Lodhi Estate built during British Raj in 1940s, and Lodhi Road Institutional Area.

History
The road follows a 14th-century dirt track connecting Ghiyathpur (now Nizamuddin) village with the Bagh-i Jud (from which the present day Jor Bagh is derived), one of the earliest orchards mentioned in Sultanate records, before joining the larger road from Rewari and Gurgaon. It has been used by invading armies, most famously by Timur's troops in 1398.

The road has always marked a boundary between neighbouring settlements. During the 15th century it divided the Kotla Mubarakpur (of the Sayyids) from the necropolis of the Lodis. In the 16th and 17th centuries it marked the boundary between the Delhi and Mehrauli tehsils. The masonry bridge over the now dried-up rivulet of Jaitpur (the village occupying the site razed by the British in 1912) is a reminder of Mughal Emperor Akbar's interest in the region. By the late 18th century the road marked the edge of the then controversial Shia enclave of Alipur, which contained the remains, houses, and troops of some estranged Persian nobles of the later Mughal court.

Overview

The road marked the edge of the original New Delhi Plan, and still defines the Lutyens Bungalow Zone (Lutyens' Delhi). Almost all the trees lining New Delhi's avenues can be traced to the Lodhi Road nursery, created as New Delhi was being planned. The road was significantly widened in preparation for the Asian Games of 1982.

The post-independence spurt of institutions constructed along Lodhi Road began with Jawaharlal Nehru's gift of some minor bungalow plots to the India International Center (IIC). The Ford Foundation, the architectural input of Joseph Allen Stein, the "brown sahib" bureaucrat nexus, and the approval of the Indian government, allowed the gradual growth of institutions built in a sultanate-cum-prairie architectural style extending as far as the Lodhi tombs in Lodhi Gardens, which Stein re-landscaped in 1968.

The Meteorological Department was soon followed by the international development community active in Delhi during the 1960s. UNICEF, WHF, and others acquired plots in what was developing into an enclave for the diplomatic and government elite. Subsequently, the Chinmaya Mission, World Bank, INTACH and India Habitat Centre (IHC) constructed buildings in sympathetic materials and architectural styles. The area was referred to as Steinabad, and Stein remained involved with the construction until the early 1990s.  In addition, the Research and Analysis Wing, India's external intelligence agency, is headquartered at Lodhi Road.

The area is largely an exclusive, elite preserve in the heart of the city, containing the offices of many large Indian companies.

Attractions 

 Lodhi Garden
 Lodhi Art District
 Aliganj Lodhi Road

Landmarks 

Krishna Sweets
Bhoj Restaurant
Aman Hotel – featuring a 50-metre pool
Air Force Bal Bharati School
 Dyal Singh College, Delhi
Institute of Company Secretaries of India, Headquarters

References

Streets in New Delhi
Roads in Delhi
Research and Analysis Wing